Kuh Kamar (also Romanized as Kūh Kamar; also known as Gav Kamar and Kūk Kamar) is a village in Baba Aman Rural District, in the Central District of Bojnord County, North Khorasan Province, Iran. At the 2006 census, its population was 434, in 92 families.

References 

Populated places in Bojnord County